Pao ocellaris is a species of pufferfish in the family Tetraodontidae. It is a tropical freshwater species native to Asia, where it is known from the Malay Peninsula. It was included in the genus Tetraodon until 2013.

References 

Tetraodontidae
Taxa named by Wolfgang Klausewitz